Unonopsis floribunda is a tree with dark bark that produces black fruit and red latex. It was first described by Ludwig Diels. It has been documented from Bolivia, Brazil, Colombia, Ecuador, Panama, and Peru.

References

Annonaceae
Trees of Peru